Kumaran is a surname. People with the surname include:

Dharshan Kumaran (born 1975), an English chess grandmaster
I. K. Kumaran (1903–1999), Indian freedom fighter who fought for liberation from France in 1954
K. P. K. Kumaran, politician and former member of the Parliament of India who represented Tamil Nadu
K. P. Kumaran, Malayalam film maker
Keezhpadam Kumaran Nair (1916–2007), Kathakali artiste in classical Indian dance-drama
Kumaran Asan (1873–1924), one of the triumvirate poets of Kerala, South India
M. K. Kumaran (1915–1994), famous writer, journalist and politician of Kerala, India
Moorkoth Kumaran (1874–1941), teacher and a prominent short story writer in Malayalam
S. S. Kumaran, Tamil film composer
Sangili Kumaran or Cankili II (died 1619), the self-proclaimed last king of the Jaffna kingdom
Thirunavukkarasu Kumaran, Indian First Class cricketer
Tiruppur Kumaran (1904–1932), Indian revolutionary who participated in the Indian independence movement